Indramayu, named after the God Indra, is a town and district which serves as the capital of Indramayu Regency in the West Java province of Indonesia, and is located in the northern coastal area of West Java, east from Jakarta, north-east from the city of Bandung, and north-west of the city of Cirebon. Most of its land are situated below sea level, which makes the district vulnerable to high tide in stormy conditions. The district is only protected by some dunes and barrages at the seaside.

History 

Dermayu is the old name of Indramayu, formerly the Indramayu area in the form of the Dermayu Sultanate since it was founded by Sultan Khalif Aria Wirasamudra in 1478 after independence from the Majapahit Kingdom. Sultan Marangali was the last Dermayu Sultan in 1770, after that this area became the Indramayu Residency or City as the beginning of the dynastic transition to guided democracy.

Administrative divisions 
Indramayu is divided into 18 villages which are as follows:

Bojongsari
Dukuh
Karanganyar
Karangmalang
Karangsong
Kepandean
Lemahabang
Lemahmekar
Margadadi
Pabean Udik
Paoman
Pekandangan
Pekandangan Jaya
Plumbon
Singajaya
Singaraja
Tambak
Telukagung

Climate 
Indramayu has a tropical savanna climate of Aw sub-type with moderate to little rainfall from May to November and heavy rainfall from December to April.

Demographics 
The number of (registered) citizens of Indramayu Regency is about 1,851,000, but in the town itself just 120,866 people reside as at mid 2021. The local population near the shore subside on fishing. Furthermore, kapok, cloves, citrus and other fruits are cultivated. Indramayu is famous for the special sweet mangosteens and is also known as one of mango producers in West Java. Indramayu was known as Indonesia's main rice supplier in the early 1980s to late 1990s.

Religion 
98.8% of the inhabitants are adherents of Islam, with the others being Protestant or Catholic Christians, Hindus, Buddhists, and Confucians.

Economy 
Crude oil is found in the Indramayu area. Pertamina, the state's oil company, have operated a refinery just outside the town since 1994.

That aside, because of an overall lack of industry and jobs, there is migration to other parts of Indonesia. In 2015, the unemployment in the town is 11.85% compared to a national average of 6.3% in 2016. Agriculture, trades, and services are the largest employers which altogether employed 73% of the workforce. The majority of "agricultural" workers are either rice farmers or fishermen, which employs about 5,000 workers each.

References

External links

 Official Site
 Photo Gallery

Indramayu Regency
Populated places in West Java
Regency seats of West Java